Maksym Horodynets is a Ukrainian male sport shooter. He competes in pistol competitions. Horodynets is a two-time European junior bronze medallist. During the 2022 season, Horodynets achieved a bronze podium rank in 25 metre rapid fire pistol mixed team event together with Anastasiia Nimets. Later in 2022, Horodynets and Yulia Korostylova became World champions in the 25 meters rapid fire pistol mixed team event.

References

External links
 

Ukrainian male sport shooters
1998 births
Living people
Sportspeople from Poltava Oblast
21st-century Ukrainian people